Adolphus Frederick II (19 October 1658 – 12 May 1708), Duke of Mecklenburg, was the first Duke of the Mecklenburg-Strelitz, reigning from 1701 until his death. Mecklenburg-Strelitz was a part of the Holy Roman Empire.

Biography
He was born in Grabow as the posthumous son of Duke Adolf Frederick I of Mecklenburg and his second wife, Maria Katharina of Brunswick-Dannenberg (1616–1665).

In 1695, the Mecklenburg-Güstrow branch of the House of Mecklenburg became extinct and Adolphus Frederick's nephew, Frederick William, Duke of Mecklenburg-Schwerin, laid claim to the inheritance, a move which Adolphus Frederick opposed.

The dispute was settled in 1701, when Adolphus Frederick reached an agreement with his nephew, Duke Friedrich Wilhelm, to take as his inheritance the Principality of Ratzeburg and the Duchy of Mecklenburg-Strelitz.

Following his death, Adolphus Frederick was succeeded as Duke by his son, Adolphus Frederick III.

Marriages and children
In 1684 Adolphus Frederick II married firstly to Marie of Mecklenburg-Güstrow (19 July 1659 – 16 January 1701), daughter of Gustav Adolph, Duke of Mecklenburg-Güstrow. They had five children:

 Adolphus Frederick III, Duke of Mecklenburg-Strelitz (Strelitz, 7 June 1686 – Schwerin, 11 December 1752).
 Duchess Magdalena Amalia of Mecklenburg-Strelitz (Strelitz, 25 April 1689 – Strelitz, 28 April 1689).
 Duchess Maria of Mecklenburg-Strelitz (born and died Strelitz, 7 August 1690).
 Duchess Eleonore Wilhelmina of Mecklenburg-Strelitz (Strelitz, 8 July 1691 – Strelitz, 9 July 1691).
 Duchess Gustave Caroline of Mecklenburg-Strelitz (Strelitz, 12 July 1694 – Schwerin, 13 April 1748) she married Christian Ludwig II, Duke of Mecklenburg.

On 20 June 1702, Adolphus Frederick II married secondly to Princess Johanna of Saxe-Gotha (1 October 1680 – 9 July 1704), a daughter of Frederick I, Duke of Saxe-Gotha-Altenburg, and Magdalena Sybille of Saxe-Weissenfels. There were no children from this marriage.

On 10 June 1705 at Neustrelitz, Adolphus Frederick II married thirdly to Princess Christiane Emilie of Schwarzburg-Sondershausen (13 March 1681 – 1 November 1751), a daughter of Christian William I, Prince of Schwarzburg-Sondershausen and Countess Antonie Sybille of Barby-Mühlingen (1641–1684). They had two children:

 Duchess Sophia Christina Louise of Mecklenburg-Strelitz (Strelitz, 12 October 1706 – Strelitz, 22 December 1708).
 Duke Charles I Louis Frederick of Mecklenburg-Strelitz (Strelitz, 23 February 1708 – Mirow, 5 June 1752), Prince of Mirow.

Through his granddaughter Charlotte, Adolphus Frederick is the ancestor of every British monarch beginning with George IV, who ascended the throne of the United Kingdom in 1820.

Ancestry

References

 

1658 births
1708 deaths
Dukes of Mecklenburg-Strelitz
House of Mecklenburg-Strelitz
People from Grabow